Falkirk West is a constituency of the Scottish Parliament (Holyrood) covering part of the council area of Falkirk. It elects one Member of the Scottish Parliament (MSP) by the plurality (first past the post) method of election. Also, however, it is one of nine constituencies in the Central Scotland electoral region, which elects seven additional members, in addition to nine constituency MSPs, to produce a form of proportional representation for the region as a whole.

The constituency was created at the same time as the Scottish Parliament, for the 1999 Scottish Parliament election. Ahead of the 2011 Scottish Parliament election the boundaries of the seat were reformed and reshaped.

The seat has been held by Michael Matheson of the Scottish National Party since the 2007 Scottish Parliament election.

Electoral region 

The other eight constituencies of the Central Scotland region are Airdrie and Shotts, Coatbridge and Chryston, Cumbernauld and Kilsyth, East Kilbride, Falkirk East, Hamilton, Larkhall and Stonehouse, Motherwell and Wishaw and Uddingston and Bellshill.

The region covers all of the Falkirk council area, all of the North Lanarkshire council area and part of the South Lanarkshire council area.

Constituency boundaries and council area 

The constituency was created at the same time as the Scottish Parliament, in 1999, with the name and boundaries of an existing Westminster constituency. In 2005, however, Scottish Westminster (House of Commons) constituencies were mostly replaced with new constituencies.

The Holyrood constituency covers a western portion of the Falkirk council area. The rest of the Falkirk area is covered by Falkirk East, which is also within the Central Scotland electoral region.

From the 2011 Scottish Parliament election, the newly reshaped Falkirk West was formed from the following electoral wards:

In full: Denny and Banknock, Bonnybridge and Larbert, Falkirk North
In part: Carse, Kinnaird and Tryst, Falkirk South (shared with Falkirk East constituency)

Member of the Scottish Parliament

Election results

2020s

2010s

2000s

1990s

Notes

External links

Constituencies of the Scottish Parliament
1999 establishments in Scotland
Constituencies established in 1999
Scottish Parliament constituencies and regions 1999–2011
Scottish Parliament constituencies and regions from 2011
Politics of Falkirk (council area)
Larbert
Denny, Falkirk